Zhambyl Kukeyev (born 20 September 1988) is a Kazakh footballer.

Career

Club
In March 2014, Kukeyev was ruled out for the foreseeable future after picking up an injury during training.

International career
Kukeyev has made 20 appearances for the Kazakhstan national football team. He scored a goal in the 5–1 defeat to England, after taking advantage of an Ashley Cole mistake.

Career statistics

Club

International

Statistics accurate as of match played 3 September 2015

International goals

References

External links

1988 births
Living people
Kazakhstani footballers
Kazakhstan international footballers
Association football midfielders
Kazakhstan Premier League players
Kazakhstan First Division players
FC Shakhter Karagandy players
FC Kairat players
FC Zhenis Astana players
FC Astana players
FC Aktobe players